Elvis Severino Rodriguez Mendoza (born 14 January 1996) is a Dominican professional boxer. As an amateur, he competed at the 2017 World Championships.

Professional career
Rodriguez made his professional debut on 9 November 2018, scoring a third-round technical knockout (TKO) victory against Valentin Juan Ortiz Hernandez at the Big Punch Arena in Tijuana, Mexico.

Professional boxing record

References

External links

Living people
1996 births
Sportspeople from Santo Domingo
Dominican Republic male boxers
Light-welterweight boxers
Southpaw boxers